Elaine George ( 1976) is an Australian fashion model of Aboriginal descent. She was the first Aboriginal model to appear on the cover of Vogue magazine (Australian edition, September 1993).

Vogue Cover
George was by photographer Grant Good who sent test shots of her to Vogue Australia editor Nancy Pilcher. Pilcher then decided to put George on the cover of the September 1993 issue of the magazine. According to former Vogue  editor Kirstie Clements, the magazine received criticism for the fact that the already light-skinned George was blown out on the cover appearing to have even lighter skin then she had.

See also
Samantha Harris, the second Aboriginal model to appear on the cover of Vogue

References

Living people
1970s births
Indigenous Australian people
People from Brisbane
Australian female models